was a Japanese business executive who served as chairman of Toyota Motor Corporation from 1992 to 1999, as well as chairman of the influential  from 1994 to 1998. Under Toyoda's leadership, Toyota started manufacturing vehicles overseas and undertook the development of the Lexus brand. He was the grandson of the Toyoda Automatic Loom Works founder Sakichi Toyoda and the son of the Toyota Motor founder Kiichiro Toyoda.

Early life and education
Shoichiro Toyoda was born in Nagoya on February 27, 1925. The eldest son and second of four children, his parents were Kiichiro Toyoda, the founder of Toyota Motor, and Hatako Toyoda. He was the grandson of Sakichi Toyoda, the founder of the Toyoda Automatic Loom Works.

Toyoda graduated from Nagoya University with a degree in engineering in 1947. He avoided being drafted during World War II, because the field of engineering was considered vital to the war effort. After graduating, he worked at a fishcake-processing plant in Hokkaido, and at a house construction firm.

In 1955, Toyoda received a PhD in engineering from Tohoku University, after completing his doctoral dissertation on fuel injection.

Career
In 1952, Toyoda joined Toyota Motor following the sudden death of his father. Until then, he had not planned to join the company, but did so at the urging of his father's cousin, Eiji Toyoda. His initial role was director of the inspection department. 

In 1957, Toyoda signed off on exporting the Toyopet Crown to the United States, after taking it on a road trip himself. Lacking an engine powerful enough to drive on US highways, however, the Crown failed to win over American drivers and incurred a significant loss for the company. The experience was a turning point for Toyoda, who later wrote that he became "determined to develop a high-quality passenger car that would perform well anywhere in the world".

Toyoda was appointed managing director in 1961, the same year that Toyota introduced Total Quality Control (TQC). In his role as deputy general manager, Toyoda became a "standard-bearer" for TQC within Toyota Motor, supporting Eiji Toyoda, who served as general manager for QC promotion and went on to become president. In 1965, Toyota Motor applied for and was awarded the Deming Prize for successful implementation of Total Quality Management (TQM). 

In 1967, Toyoda was promoted to senior managing director, and became executive vice president in 1972. Company highlights during this period included the launch of the Toyota Corolla in 1966, and its introduction to the US market in 1968; the Corolla became the bestselling car in the world in 1974, and went on to become the bestselling car of all time.

Integration of Toyota Motor Corporation 
In 1981, Toyoda moved from Toyota Motor to become president of Toyota Motor Sales. In 1982, the two organizations merged to form Toyota Motor Corporation, with Toyoda as the new entity's president. He served as chairman from 1992 to 1999; and he became honorary chairman in 1999.

Following the merger of Toyota Motor with Toyota Motor Sales, Toyoda led a concerted effort to blend the two organizations' distinct corporate cultures, emphasizing what he called "'The Three Cs': Creativity, Challenge and Courage". Until then, their management philosophies had been compared to "oil and water"; the old Toyota Motor had prioritized "efficiency", while Toyota Motor Sales had a more "free and open" culture. In 1984, a group was formed to explore organizational reform within Toyota, which found that the company suffered from "big company disease", discouraging younger employees from proposing new ideas due to the bureaucracy which had become entrenched within the old Toyota Motor. Toyoda pushed the company to overcome its "rigidity" to encourage innovation, and in 1988, nearly all the recommendations of the study group were adopted.

Starting in 1990, Toyoda shifted gears to emphasize contributions to society, rather than corporate social responsibility. In 1992, the company updated its Basic Precepts with new Basic Principles, and also issued a document that came to be known as the Toyota Global Earth Charter. Before stepping down as president in 1992, Toyoda drove the adoption of the Toyota Development Center System, organizing the company in "clusters" that would help foster creativity and innovation.

International expansion 
Under Toyoda's leadership, Toyota expanded its global footprint by manufacturing vehicles in local markets, starting with North America. In 1983, Toyoda opened discussions with General Motors to form a joint venture to take over a GM factory in California. Called NUMMI, the New United Motor Manufacturing, Inc., started producing the Toyota Corolla, as well as the Chevrolet Nova, in 1984. 

Two years later, Toyota opened its first wholly-owned vehicle manufacturing plant in Kentucky, and began production of the Toyota Camry in 1988. When the plant was opened, Toyoda stated that the company would "work hard to become a good citizen of Kentucky and America". The company subsequently opened plants in Cambridge, Ontario in Canada, and Burnaston in the United Kingdom. By the time Toyoda became chairman in 1992, Toyota had manufacturing plants in 22 countries.

New vehicle designs 
After successfully building Toyota's reputation as a manufacturer of affordable compact cars, in 1989, the company introduced the Lexus brand of luxury automobiles to the US market, as Toyoda aimed to design a vehicle that could compete with German models. In 1991, Toyota introduced the first wide-body Camry, an example of the growing number of vehicles specifically designed for markets outside Japan.

Even after he was no longer involved in day-to-day management of the company, Toyoda remained personally interested in car design, and was an enthusiastic participant at test-drive events into his later years. Toyoda was a staunch opponent of Toyota's participation in Formula One races, publicly disagreeing with later company president Hiroshi Okuda, who nevertheless entered Toyota into the F1 in 1999 and orchestrated its purchase of the Fuji Speedway in 2000.

Chairman of Keidanren 
From 1994 to 1998, Toyoda served as chairman of Keidanren, the Japanese Business Federation. Taking the helm of the powerful business lobbying organization in the aftermath of the Japanese asset price bubble, Toyoda helped to navigate tense trade relations with the US. When his younger brother Tatsuro Toyoda, the new president of Toyota Motor Corporation, was unable to join discussions with US Ambassador Walter Mondale due to illness, Shoichiro stepped in as chairman of Toyota to negotiate the voluntary purchase of more American parts to help alleviate the US trade deficit with Japan, roughly half of which was due to automobiles. Toyoda also led Keidanren in lobbying the government to reduce corporate tax rates and deregulate the economy.

Personal life
Toyoda remained honorary chairman of Toyota from 1999 until his death. He died of sudden heart failure on February 14, 2023, at age 97. He was survived by his wife, daughter, and son Akio Toyoda, who has served as president of Toyota Motor Corporation for 14 years and will step down from the post in April 2023.

Professional recognition
 1980: Deming Prize, Japan
 1993: International Fellow Royal Academy of Engineering
 2000: FISITA Medal of the International Federation of Automotive Engineering Societies
 2005: Society of Automotive Engineers Foundation's Manufacturing Leadership Award, United States
 2007: Induction into the Automotive Hall of Fame, Detroit, Michigan, USA

National honors (Japan)
 November 1984: Medal of Honor (Blue Ribbon)
 April 1995: Grand Cordon of the Order of the Sacred Treasure
 April 2002: Grand Cordon of the Order of the Rising Sun
 November 2007: Grand Cordon of the Order of the Paulownia Flowers

Other national honors and decorations
 May 1986: Grand Cross of the Order of Antonio Jose de Sucre of Venezuela
 September 1990: Knight Commander of the Order of the Crown of Thailand
 April 1991: Commander of the Order of Leopold of Belgium
 December 1991: Grand Cross of the National Order of Merit of Colombia
 March 1995: Knight Commander of the Order of the British Empire (KBE), UK
 September 1995: Grand Cross of the Order of Francisco de Miranda, Venezuela (Commander: October 1988))
 March 1996: Ordem Nacional do Cruzeiro do Sul, Brazil
 February 1998: Order of Merit of the Republic of Turkey
 June 1999: Companion of the Order of Australia (AC)
 November 1999: Grand Decoration of Honour in Gold with Star for Services to the Republic of Austria
 March 2000: Commander of the Order of Isabel the Catholic, Spain
 May 2001: Commander's Cross of the Bundesverdienstkreuz, Germany.
 April 2004: Commander's Cross with Star of the Order of Merit of the Republic of Poland, Poland
 December 2004: Knight Grand Cordon of the Order of the Direkgunabhorn, First Class, Thailand
 March 2005: Grand Officer of the Légion d'honneur of France (Commander: April 1998)
 May 2005: Grand Cross of the Order of Merit of Portugal (GCM)
 August 2005: Grand Cross of the Order of Juan Mora Fernandez, Placa de Plata of Costa Rica
 September 2005: Commander of the Order of the Equatorial Star of Gabon
 October 2007: Knight Grand Cross with the Grand Collar of the Order of Merit of the Italian Republic (Grand Officer: June 1998)
 April 2010: Grand Collar of the Order of Lakandula of the Philippines

Citations

General and cited references 
 Basu, Shankar (1999). Corporate Purpose: Why It Matters More Than Strategy. London: Taylor & Francis. .
 Hino, Satoshi, and Andrew Dillon (2006). Inside the Mind of Toyota: Management Principles for Enduring Growth. Productivity Press.  . .

External links 
 Toyota Motor Corporation: official bio

1925 births
2023 deaths
Chief executives in the automobile industry
Commanders Crosses of the Order of Merit of the Federal Republic of Germany
Commanders of the Order of Isabella the Catholic
Commanders with Star of the Order of Merit of the Republic of Poland
Grand Cordons of the Order of the Rising Sun
Grand Crosses of the Order of Lakandula
Grand Crosses of the Order of Merit (Portugal)
Grand Officiers of the Légion d'honneur
Honorary Companions of the Order of Australia
Honorary Fellows of the London School of Economics
Honorary Knights Commander of the Order of the British Empire
Japanese chief executives
Shoichiro Toyoda
Knights Grand Cross with Collar of the Order of Merit of the Italian Republic
Nagoya University alumni
People from Aichi Prefecture
Presidents of the Japan Automobile Manufacturers Association
Recipients of the Grand Decoration with Star for Services to the Republic of Austria
Recipients of the Order of Isabella the Catholic
Recipients of the Order of Merit of the Republic of Turkey
Recipients of the Order of the Paulownia Flowers
Recipients of the Order of the Sacred Treasure, 1st class
Tohoku University alumni
Shoichiro
Toyota people